Joaquín Marcelo Laso (born 4 July 1990) is an Argentine professional footballer who plays as a centre-back for Independiente.

Career
Laso had youth spells with Ferroviarios, Racing Club, Cadetes and Quilmes. His senior career started in 2009 with Argentine Primera División team Tigre, he failed to make a first-team appearance in two years and left in 2011 to join Unión Mar del Plata of Torneo Argentino A. However, his spell in Mar del Plata was short as he soon departed. In 2012, Laso joined Torneo Argentino B side Huracán. He went onto make twenty-five appearances and score twice in one season. 2013 saw Laso join Primera C Metropolitana team Sportivo Italiano. Overall, he scored six goals in fifty-one matches; including in his penultimate game versus Acassuso.

On 13 January 2015, Laso completed a move to the Primera División's Argentinos Juniors. He made his top-flight debut in May in a home loss to Aldosivi. Following relegation in 2016, Laso appeared twenty-three times as Argentinos won the 2016–17 Primera B Nacional. On 2 January 2018, Laso joined Vélez Sarsfield on a free transfer. His opening appearance for Vélez came on 27 January versus Defensa y Justicia. After eighteen months with them, Laso departed in June 2019 to Liga MX's Atlético San Luis; his first experience abroad.

Career statistics
.

Honours
Sportivo Italiano
Primera C Metropolitana: 2013–14

Argentinos Juniors
Primera B Nacional: 2016–17

References

External links

1990 births
Living people
People from Balcarce Partido
Argentine footballers
Association football defenders
Argentine expatriate footballers
Torneo Argentino A players
Torneo Argentino B players
Primera C Metropolitana players
Primera B Metropolitana players
Argentine Primera División players
Primera Nacional players
Liga MX players
Club Atlético Tigre footballers
Unión de Mar del Plata footballers
Huracán de Tres Arroyos footballers
Sportivo Italiano footballers
Argentinos Juniors footballers
Club Atlético Vélez Sarsfield footballers
Atlético San Luis footballers
Rosario Central footballers
Cadetes de San Martín players
Club Atlético Independiente footballers
Expatriate footballers in Mexico
Argentine expatriate sportspeople in Mexico
Sportspeople from Buenos Aires Province